Vachellia belairioides is a species of legume in the family Fabaceae. It is found only in Cuba, confined to Holguín Province in northeastern Cuba. It is threatened by habitat loss.

References

belairioides
Flora of Cuba
Critically endangered plants
Taxonomy articles created by Polbot